FC Ritm Alekseyevka was a Russian football team from Alexeyevka. It played professionally in 1991, 1992 and 1995. Their best result was 8th place in Zone 2 of the Russian Second Division in 1992.

Team name history
 1991–1992: FC Ritm Belgorod (according to some sources, there is no connection between FC Ritm Belgorod and FC Ritm Alekseyevka)
 1994–1996: FC Ritm Alekseyevka

External links
  Team history at KLISF

Association football clubs established in 1991
Association football clubs disestablished in 1996
Defunct football clubs in Russia
Sport in Belgorod Oblast
1991 establishments in Russia
1996 disestablishments in Russia